Lysine-specific demethylase 5C is an enzyme that in humans is encoded by the KDM5C gene. KDM5C belongs to the alpha-ketoglutarate-dependent hydroxylase superfamily.

Function 

This gene is a member of the SMCY homolog family and encodes a protein with one ARID domain, one JmjC domain, one JmjN domain and two PHD-type zinc fingers. The DNA-binding motif suggest this protein is involved in the regulation of transcription and chromatin remodeling. Mutations in this gene have been associated with X-linked intellectual disability. Alternatively spliced variants that encode different protein isoforms have been described but the full-length nature of only one has been determined.

See also
 Xp11.2 duplication, section KDM5C

References

Further reading

External links 
 

Transcription factors
Genes on human chromosome X
Human 2OG oxygenases
EC 1.14.11